Lars Isacsson or Lars Isaksson (born 1970) is a Swedish politician and member of the Riksdag, the national legislature. A member of the Social Democratic Party, he has represented Dalarna County since September 2012. He had previously been a member of the municipal council in Avesta Municipality.

References

1970 births
Living people
Members of the Riksdag 2022–2026
Members of the Riksdag from the Social Democrats
People from Avesta Municipality